The 1948 New Mexico gubernatorial election took place on November 2, 1948, in order to elect the Governor of New Mexico. Incumbent Democrat Thomas J. Mabry won reelection to a second term, defeating Manuel Lujan Sr., mayor of Santa Fe.

General election

Results

References

gubernatorial
1948
New Mexico
November 1948 events in the United States